Ms. John Soda is an  indietronica band from Weilheim in Oberbayern, Germany. It consists of Stefanie Böhm and Micha Acher.

History
Ms. John Soda released the first album No P. or D. on Morr Music in 2002. It is listed by Pitchfork Media as the 45th top album of 2003.

The While Talking EP was released on Morr Music in 2003. It includes "I & #8217," a remix medley of tracks from No P. or D. by Subtle.

The duo released the second album Notes and the Like on Morr Music in 2006.

Discography

Albums
 No P. or D. (2002)
 Notes and the Like (2006)
 Loom (2015)

EPs
 Drop = Scene (2002)
 While Talking (2003)

References

External links
 Official website
 

German musical groups
Morr Music artists